Sergei Ivanovich Romanovich (born 18 February 1984) is a Russian former professional football player.

Club career
He played two seasons in the Russian Football National League for FC Amur Blagoveshchensk, FC Zvezda Irkutsk and FC Mashuk-KMV Pyatigorsk.

External links
 
 

1984 births
Living people
Russian footballers
Association football forwards
FC Dynamo Vologda players
FC Zvezda Irkutsk players
FC Solyaris Moscow players
FC MVD Rossii Moscow players
FC Sportakademklub Moscow players
FC Mashuk-KMV Pyatigorsk players
FC Amur Blagoveshchensk players